St. John's Lutheran Church is a historic Lutheran church complex located at Ancram in Columbia County, New York.  The complex includes the church, parsonage (ca. 1853), 19th century horse sheds, and church hall (ca. 1910).  The church was built in 1847 and is a rectangular, heavy timber frame meeting house that received major modifications in 1854, 1886, and 1906.  It is sparsely decorated in Greek Revival style.  The current bell tower was added in 1886.

It was listed on the National Register of Historic Places in 2009.

References

External links
St. John's Lutheran Church - Ancram, New York

Churches completed in 1847
19th-century Lutheran churches in the United States
Lutheran churches in New York (state)
Churches on the National Register of Historic Places in New York (state)
Churches in Columbia County, New York
1847 establishments in New York (state)
National Register of Historic Places in Columbia County, New York